Miroslav Čovilo (born 6 May 1986) is a Bosnian-Herzegovinian football midfielder.

Club career
After playing initially with Velež Nevesinje, he moved in 2006 to Serbia where he played with lower league clubs Jedinstvo Stara Pazova and Novi Sad before coming initially on loan in 2010 to Inđija a newcomer back then in the Serbian SuperLiga. In January 2011 he moved to another SuperLiga club, Spartak Subotica. In August 2011 he was loaned to Hajduk Kula, and on late February 2012, he definitely sealed his move to Hajduk. On 3 June 2012, Hajduk Kula supporters elected Čovilo as the best club player for the 2011–12 season.

He extended his contract with Swiss side Lugano for another year in June 2020. He was released by Lugano on 25 August 2021.

References

External links
 
 

1986 births
Living people
Sportspeople from Mostar
Serbs of Bosnia and Herzegovina
Association football midfielders
Bosnia and Herzegovina footballers
RFK Novi Sad 1921 players
FK Inđija players
FK Spartak Subotica players
FK Hajduk Kula players
FC Koper players
NK Domžale players
MKS Cracovia (football) players
FC Lugano players
Serbian First League players
Serbian SuperLiga players
Slovenian PrvaLiga players
Ekstraklasa players
Swiss Super League players
Bosnia and Herzegovina expatriate footballers
Expatriate footballers in Serbia
Bosnia and Herzegovina expatriate sportspeople in Serbia
Expatriate footballers in Slovenia
Bosnia and Herzegovina expatriate sportspeople in Slovenia
Expatriate footballers in Poland
Bosnia and Herzegovina expatriate sportspeople in Poland
Expatriate footballers in Switzerland
Bosnia and Herzegovina expatriate sportspeople in Switzerland